Lalo may refer to:


Places
Lalo, Benin, a town
Lalo, Tokelau, an island in the South Pacific
Lalo railway station, Lalo subdistrict, Thailand

People
 Lalo (given name)
 Lalo (nickname)
 Lalo (surname)

Other uses
 Lalo Salamanca, a fictional character in Better Call Saul
 Lalo, a fictional character in the 2007 animated film Ratatouille
 Lalo language, Chinese language cluster

See also

 Lalo = Brilliance, 1962 Lalo Schifrin album
 Lallo (disambiguation)
 Lalo-Honua, Hawaiian mythological figure